Caroline Spencer is a character from the soap opera The Bold and the Beautiful.

Caroline Spencer may also refer to:

 Caroline Berryman Spencer (1861–1948), socialite and editor of Illustrated American
 Caroline Spencer, Duchess of Marlborough (1743–1811), wife of George Spencer, 4th Duke of Marlborough
 Caroline Spencer (suffragist) (1861–1928), American physician and suffragist